Del Duca may refer to:

Antonio del Duca (1491–1564), a Sicilian friar
Cino Del Duca (1899–1967), an Italian-born businessman film producer and philanthropist
Giacomo del Duca (c. 1520–1604), an Italian sculptor and architect
Marcello Del Duca (born 1950), an Italian former water polo player
Simone Del Duca (1912–2004), a French businesswoman, and major philanthropist, married to Cino Del Duca
Steven Del Duca (born c. 1973), a Canadian politician and former leader of the Ontario Liberal Party

See also
Prix mondial Cino Del Duca, an international literary award
Simone and Cino Del Duca Foundation, a charitable foundation based in Paris
Stadio Cino e Lillo Del Duca, a multi-purpose stadium in Ascoli Piceno, Italy